Wallace Run is one of six streams with this name in Pennsylvania, United States:

 Wallace Run (Mohongahela River)  in Fayette County
 Wallace Run (Clearfield Creek)  in Clearfield County
 Wallace Run (Sugar Creek)  in Bradford County
 Wallace Run (Oakland Run)  in York County
 Wallace Run (Beaver River tributary)  in Beaver County
 Wallace Run (Bald Eagle Creek)  in Centre County